Igor Zelenay (born 10 February 1982) is a Slovak professional tennis player. He is a doubles specialist who has won 1 ATP Tour title and finished runner-up at 4 other ATP 250 tournaments. He reached a career-high ranking of World No. 50 in July 2009. His career-high singles ranking is World No. 279, achieved in August 2005.

Career
Zelenay reached his first ATP doubles final at the 2010 Delray Beach International Tennis Championships, where he and his partner Philipp Marx lost in straight sets to the Bryan brothers.

ATP career finals

Doubles: 5 (1 title, 4 runner-ups)

Challenger and Futures finals

Singles: 7 (2–5)

Doubles: 96 (60–36)

Doubles performance timeline

References

External links
 
 
 
 
 
 
 

1982 births
Living people
Slovak male tennis players
Tennis players at the 2016 Summer Olympics
Olympic tennis players of Slovakia
Universiade medalists in tennis
Sportspeople from Trenčín
Universiade silver medalists for Slovakia
Universiade bronze medalists for Slovakia
Medalists at the 2003 Summer Universiade